Alen Halilović (born 18 June 1996) is a Croatian professional footballer who plays as an attacking midfielder for Croatian SuperSport HNL club Rijeka.

As the Prva HNL's youngest ever goalscorer (until May 2021) and the youngest ever debutant for the Croatian national team, he was considered to be one of the most promising young talents of European football. On 27 March 2014, Barcelona reached an agreement with Dinamo Zagreb for a five-year transfer to the club. He made one appearance for the senior team (in the Copa del Rey), spending most of the season with the B-team. He then had a season-long loan to Sporting Gijón, before signing for Hamburg in July 2016. He spent much of the next two seasons on loan to Las Palmas before joining AC Milan. Again, he played little for his parent club, instead having loan spells with Standard Liège and Heerenveen. After his Milan contract was cancelled in October 2020, he spent what remained of the season with Birmingham City.

Club career

Dinamo Zagreb
On 27 September 2012, he made his debut for the first team in the "Eternal derby" win over Hajduk Split (3–1), when he replaced Sammir for the final ten minutes of the match. This made him the youngest debutant in the history of Dinamo Zagreb, at the age of 16 years and 101 days. In the next round match against Slaven Belupo, he again came off the bench and scored the final goal in a 4–1 victory. This made him the youngest goalscorer in the history of the league, at the age of 16 years and 112 days – breaking the record set in November 2010 by his teammate, Mateo Kovačić. The record would last until 22 May 2021, when Lovro Zvonarek broke it by scoring his first goal aged 16 years and 14 days. In November 2012, Halilović scored his second league goal for Dinamo in a 5–0 win against NK Zadar, from outside of the box on an assist provided by Kovačić. In his first professional season with Dinamo, he also managed to participate in UEFA Champions League. On 24 October 2012, he made his European debut in the 90th minute of the encounter against the French team Paris Saint-Germain at Maksimir Stadium, coming on as a substitute for Kovačić. Thus he became the club's youngest player ever to feature in a Champions League match, and second youngest player in the history of the UEFA Champions League.

Barcelona
On 27 March 2014, FC Barcelona reached an agreement with Dinamo Zagreb for Halilović to join Barcelona in July 2014 at the start of the summer transfer window. He signed a five-year contract for an initial amount of €2.2 million, set to increase if he secures a spot on the first team, and was assigned to the reserves in Segunda División.

On 2 April 2014, FIFA announced that Barcelona would be banned from buying players until summer 2015 after illegally signing underaged players, putting the move in doubt. On 23 April 2014, FC Barcelona's transfer ban was suspended pending an appeal, allowing the transfer to go ahead for the time being. On 2 May 2014, Halilović signed for Barcelona on a five-year contract for €2.2 million.

Halilović made his first appearance for Barcelona's senior team on 15 January 2015, replacing Adama Traoré for the last 28 minutes of a 4–0 away win against Elche CF in the last 16 of the Copa del Rey.

Loan to Sporting Gijón
On 21 August 2015, he was loaned to fellow league team Sporting de Gijón, in a season-long deal. On 29 August, Halilović made his La Liga debut, coming on as a second-half substitute for Carlos Carmona in a 0–0 away draw against Real Sociedad. His first goal in the category came on 3 October, opening a 2–1 win away to RCD Espanyol, and on 1 November he netted the only goal of a win against Málaga CF at El Molinón.

Halilović was a half-time substitute for Nacho Cases on 15 December in the national cup last-32 second leg and scored twice – one a penalty kick – to ensure a 3–3 home draw against Real Betis, who advanced 5–3 on aggregate.

Hamburger SV
On 19 July 2016, it was announced that Halilović would join Bundesliga side Hamburger SV for €5.5 million, with a buy-back clause for Barcelona worth €10 million. Two days later the move was confirmed, with Halilović signing a four-year deal. Halilović scored his first goal for the club on his debut in a DFB-Pokal cup match against FSV Zwickau on 22 August 2016.  This was the only goal of the match and helped Hamburg to the next round. He had to wait until 10 September to make his league debut, however, which was in the second league game of the season against Bayer Leverkusen.

Loan to Las Palmas

In January 2017, Halilović joined Las Palmas for 18 months in a loan deal, with an option for Las Palmas to buy him.

In the first game of the 2017/18 season for Las Palmas, playing against Valencia, Halilović received a straight red card for a tackle on José Gayá, in the 33rd minute.

AC Milan
On 3 July 2018, Alen Halilović joined Serie A club AC Milan on a free transfer. He signed a contract until 30 June 2021.

Loan to Standard Liège
On 31 January 2019, Halilović joined Standard Liège on loan with an option to buy until 30 June 2020.

Loan to SC Heerenveen
Starting September 2019, Halilović's loan to Standard Liége got cancelled and he went on loan to the Dutch team SC Heerenveen for the duration of a year.

Following the abandonment of the Eredivisie on 24 April 2020 due to the COVID-19 pandemic, Halilović returned to Milan. On 5 October, Milan announced they terminated his contract by mutual consent.

Birmingham City
On 23 November 2020, Halilović joined EFL Championship club Birmingham City as a free agent; he signed until the end of the season. After a lengthy wait for international clearance, he made his Birmingham debut as a second-half substitute in a 1–0 win away to Bristol City on 5 December. He scored his first and only goal for Birmingham on 27 February 2021 with "a superb left-footed curler from " to complete a 2–1 win over Queens Park Rangers. In celebration, he took off his shirt to reveal a caricature depicting Serbian musician Đorđe Balašević, who had died eight days earlier. He made 17 league appearances, and was offered terms for the coming season, but had not signed by the time his contract expired.

Reading
Halilović signed a one-year deal with another Championship club, Reading, on 27 August 2021. On 20 May 2022, Reading confirmed that Halilović would leave the club at the end of his contract with the club.

Rijeka
On 6 July 2022 Halilović officially signed for the Croatian SuperSport HNL club Rijeka on a free transfer.

International career

Halilović was eligible to play for Croatia or Bosnia and Herzegovina on international level, opting for the former and representing them at various youth levels. In March 2013, he was a member of Croatia U17 that qualified for the European Under-17 Championship in Slovakia. On 10 June 2013, Halilović made his debut for the senior team against Portugal in a friendly match as a 50th-minute substitute for Ivan Strinić. At age 16, he became the youngest debutant in the history of Croatia.

In 2016, ahead of Euro 2016, Halilović was left out of the 23-man squad for the tournament, reportedly taking it personally. He did not make an appearance for the national team until June 2019, when he played 30 minutes in a friendly against Tunisia. Later that month, he captained Croatia at Under-21 Euro 2019. After a heavy 4–1 loss to Romania, he was left on the bench for the remaining matches against France and England, as Croatia failed to qualify for the knockout stage.

Personal life 

His father, Sejad Halilović, is a former Bosnian and Croatian international who also played for Dinamo Zagreb. The entire family relocated to Spain when he was signed by FC Barcelona, with his two younger brothers, Dino and Damir, also being signed to play for one of the club's youth teams. He is a supporter of Bosnian club FK Sarajevo.

Career statistics

Club

International

Honours
Source:

Dinamo Zagreb 
 Prva HNL: 2012–13, 2013–14
 Croatian Supercup: 2013

Barcelona 
 Copa del Rey: 2014–15

References

External links

1996 births
Living people
Sportspeople from Dubrovnik
Croatian people of Bosniak descent
Association football midfielders
Croatian footballers
Croatia youth international footballers
Croatia under-21 international footballers
Croatia international footballers
GNK Dinamo Zagreb players
FC Barcelona Atlètic players
FC Barcelona players
Sporting de Gijón players
Hamburger SV players
UD Las Palmas players
A.C. Milan players
Standard Liège players
SC Heerenveen players
Birmingham City F.C. players
Reading F.C. players
HNK Rijeka players
Croatian Football League players
Segunda División players
La Liga players
Bundesliga players
Serie A players
Belgian Pro League players
Eredivisie players
Croatian expatriate footballers
Expatriate footballers in Spain
Croatian expatriate sportspeople in Spain
Expatriate footballers in Germany
Croatian expatriate sportspeople in Germany
Expatriate footballers in Italy
Croatian expatriate sportspeople in Italy
Expatriate footballers in Belgium
Croatian expatriate sportspeople in Belgium
Expatriate footballers in the Netherlands
Croatian expatriate sportspeople in the Netherlands
Expatriate footballers in England
Croatian expatriate sportspeople in England